There Ain't No Black in the Union Jack: The Cultural Politics of Race and Nation is a 1987 non-fiction book written by British academic Paul Gilroy.

Overview

In the book, Gilroy examines the racial politics of the United Kingdom, and "demonstrates the enormous complexity of racial politics in England today". Gilroy's views on racial politics in Great Britain, along with his views on race and ethnicity, have been controversial in certain academic circles.

References

External links
Goodreads

English non-fiction books
1987 non-fiction books
English-language books
Books about race and ethnicity
Identity politics
Books about the United Kingdom